The Lipinski Stradivarius is an antique violin constructed in 1715 by the Italian luthier Antonio Stradivari of Cremona, during Stradivari's "golden period"  between 1700 and 1725. There are fewer than 650 extant Stradivarius violins in the world today, and the Lipinski is considered to be a particularly fine example. In 2012, it was appraised at US$5 million.

History
The earlier history of The Lipinski is unclear; Italian violinist and composer Giuseppe Tartini is the first reputed owner. Tartini, who in 1713 experienced a dream in which he allowed the devil to play his violin, heard a beautiful sonata which he was unable to compare with anything he had ever heard. Tartini, two years later, tried to reproduce the sound in his Devil's Trill Sonata.

Lipinski
Tartini presented the violin to his pupil, Signor Salvini. According to a reminiscence of a certain von Krockow, who met the Polish violinist Karol Lipiński in Dresden in 1849, the young Lipinski, provided with a letter of recommendation from Louis Spohr, met Salvini in Milan, probably at the end of his concert tour (1817–18).  After Lipinski performed for Salvini, the teacher asked to see his violin, which he then smashed to pieces against the corner of a table. Salvini handed the shocked Lipinski the Stradivarius: "...as a gift from me, and, simultaneously, as a commemoration of Tartini."

Post-Lipinski
Following Lipinski's death, the violin passed through numerous collections enumerated by Herbert Goodkind, until it came into the possession of Dr José Martinez Cañas, Havana, Cuba.

Contemporary ownership
In 1962, the Lipinski Stradivarius was sold to Rosalind Elsner Anschuetz of New York City, for US$19,000.  Anschuetz gave the violin to her daughter-in-law, Estonian violinist Evi Liivak, and upon her death in 1996, Liivak's husband, Richard Anschuetz, took possession of the instrument.  After Anschuetz moved to the Milwaukee, Wisconsin area, the violin was stored in a local bank vault.  Upon Anschuetz' death in February 2008,  ownership of the violin passed to an anonymous family member, who lent the Lipinski to Milwaukee Symphony Orchestra concertmaster Frank Almond.

2014 theft
On January 27, 2014, a Monday, at around 10:20 pm (22:20 CST), Almond was assaulted with a Taser, and the violin, including two bows, was stolen during an armed robbery in a parking lot in the rear of Wisconsin Lutheran College on West Wisconsin Avenue. Almond had just performed at Wisconsin Lutheran as part of his "Frankly Music" series.

On 31 January 2014, a US$100,000 reward was announced for the return of the violin. Milwaukee police worked with international police organizations on recovery efforts. The original getaway vehicle and violin case were both found a short time after the original attack, which appeared to have been carefully planned in advance.

Three suspects were arrested by Milwaukee police on February 3, 2014. On February 6, 2014, Milwaukee Police Chief Edward Flynn announced that the violin had been recovered.

Provenance
Giuseppe Tartini
Signor Salvini, Milan
Karol Lipinski
Richard Weichold, instrument dealer, Dresden, 1861
Engelbert Röntgen, Leipzig
owner not known
W. E. Hill & Sons, instrument dealers, London, 1899
Unknown amateur musician, Holland
Hill & Sons, instrument dealers, London
owner not known
Hamma, instrument dealers, Germany
Unknown
Wurlitzer, New York, 1922
Alfredo de Saint Malo, 1927
Roger Chittolini
José Martínez Cañas, Havana, 1941
Wurlitzer, instrument dealers, New York, 1960
Rosalind Elsner Anschuetz / Richard Anschuetz, Evi Liivak, 1962
Anonymous Anschuetz family member, Milwaukee, 2008

Joseph Joachim, Liivak, Malonzenoff, and Persinger are also known to have possessed the Lipinski Stradivarius.

See also
List of Stradivarius instruments

References

Further reading

External links
 
 The Lipinski (2016), a short film by Fourth City.

1715 musical instruments
Stradivari violins
1715 works
Stradivari instruments